Public art in New York City includes statues, memorials, murals, fountains, and other forms. The city's parks have been described as the "greatest outdoor public art museum" in the United States. With works from such great sculptors as Augustus Saint-Gaudens, Daniel Chester French, and John Quincy Adams Ward, over 300 sculptures are found on the streets and in parks across the New York metropolitan area.

Manhattan

The Bronx
 The Bronx Victory Column in Pelham Bay Park.
 Lorelei Fountain by Ernst Herter in Joyce Kilmer Park near the Grand Concourse.

Brooklyn

Queens

Staten Island
 Postcards September 11 memorial
 Francis the Praying Mantis
 Hari IV by Bill Barrett outside of New Dorp High School

References

External links 

New York City

New York
Lists of New York City landmarks